Dalia María Contreras Rivero (born September 20, 1983) is a Venezuelan taekwondo practitioner. She won a bronze medal at the 2008 Summer Olympics in taekwondo. She also competed at the 2004 Summer Olympics, finishing 8th in her weight class.

She won a Silver Medal at the 2003 Pan American Games in Santo Domingo

In the 2002 South American Games in Brazil she finished in the second place in her category (Finweight –47 kg), but the South American Sports Organization (ODESUR) gave only gold medals in that category. Finally, in the 2006 South American Games in Buenos Aires, she won the gold medal. Notwithstanding, that year ODESUR gave the silver and bronze medals

Olympic results 
2004
Finish in 8th.
2008
Finish in 3rd, bronze Medal

References

1983 births
Living people
Venezuelan female taekwondo practitioners
Olympic taekwondo practitioners of Venezuela
Taekwondo practitioners at the 2004 Summer Olympics
Taekwondo practitioners at the 2007 Pan American Games
Taekwondo practitioners at the 2008 Summer Olympics
Olympic bronze medalists for Venezuela
Olympic medalists in taekwondo
Medalists at the 2008 Summer Olympics
Pan American Games silver medalists for Venezuela
Pan American Games medalists in taekwondo
Central American and Caribbean Games gold medalists for Venezuela
Competitors at the 2002 Central American and Caribbean Games
Competitors at the 2006 Central American and Caribbean Games
South American Games gold medalists for Venezuela
South American Games medalists in taekwondo
Competitors at the 2002 South American Games
Competitors at the 2006 South American Games
World Taekwondo Championships medalists
Central American and Caribbean Games medalists in taekwondo
Medalists at the 2003 Pan American Games
21st-century Venezuelan women